The 2016 Honda Indy Grand Prix of Alabama was the 4th round of the 2016 IndyCar Series. The race was contested over 90 laps at Barber Motorsports Park in Birmingham, Alabama. It was the 7th time that the IndyCar Series had raced on the circuit. In qualifying, Simon Pagenaud took pole position with a time of 1:06.7762, beating out his teammate Will Power. Sébastien Bourdais set a new track record during the second round of qualifications with a time of 1:06.6001, but was unable to match that pace in the third round of qualifying, relegating him to a fifth place start. Championship contender Juan Pablo Montoya struggled heavily in qualifying, placing 21st and last.

The race opened with an incident before it even started. As the field came off the final turn to prepare to take the green flag, Carlos Muñoz tipped Mikhail Aleshin into a spin, sending Aleshin and Jack Hawksworth off into the outside grass. All involved escaped major damage, while the rest of the field ran an extra lap under yellow before the start. It would be the only caution flag of the day. Simon Pagenaud held the lead when the race started, with Power slotting in behind him. Further back in the field, Sébastien Bourdais and Scott Dixon made contact in turn five, sending Dixon into a spin and causing front wing damage to Bourdais' car. Both would continue, but their races were both greatly hampered due to the incident.

Pagenaud dominated the majority of the race. However, in the closing laps, Pagenaud was held up in lap traffic, allowing Graham Rahal to catch up and set a thrilling duel for the lead. On lap 82, Rahal and Pagenaud made contact entering turn seven, sending Pagenaud off course and handing Rahal the lead. The lead would be short lived, as four laps later, Pagenaud caught back up and attempted to make a pass at the exit of turn six. In the middle of the move, Rahal made contact with back-marker Jack Hawksworth, damaging Rahal's front wing and ending any chance of holding off Pagenaud. Pagenaud would extend his lead and take victory by 13.7 seconds. It was Pagenaud second consecutive victory of the season. Despite his damaged wing, Rahal managed to hang on and finish second. Josef Newgarden finished third. Despite his terrible starting position, Juan Pablo Montoya was able to charge through the field and finish in a respectable fifth place. The highest finishing rookie was Alexander Rossi, who came across the line in 15th, the last car on the lead lap.

For the second year in a row, there were no DNFs.

Report

Qualifying

Source for individual rounds:

Race Results

Notes
 Points include 1 point for leading at least 1 lap during a race, an additional 2 points for leading the most race laps, and 1 point for Pole Position.

Source for time gaps:

Championship standings after the race

Drivers' Championship standings

 Note: Only the top five positions are included.

References

External links
Official Pit Stop Data

Official Race Broadcast

Grand Prix of Alabama
Honda Indy Grand Prix of Alabama
2016 Honda Indy Grand Prix of Alabama
Honda Indy Grand Prix of Alabama